Flesberg is a municipality in the traditional and electoral district Buskerud in Viken county, Norway.  It is part of the traditional region of Numedal.  The administrative centre of the municipality is the village of Lampeland.

The economy of Flesberg is dominated by forestry and agriculture, as well as the cluster of high-tech industries in neighbouring Kongsberg.

General information

Etymology 
The municipality (originally the parish) is named after the old Flesberg farm (Old Norse: Flesberg), since the first church was built here. The first element is fles which means "rock" and the last element is berg which means "mountain".

Coat-of-arms 
The coat-of-arms is from modern times.  They were granted on 10 March 1989.  The arms show two tømmerklaver to represent forestry – and also the letter F.

History 

Flesberg Stave Church was built around the year 1250. After reconstruction in 1735, the church conformed with cruciform plan.  The municipality of Flesberg was established on 1 January 1838 (see formannskapsdistrikt). The area of Jondalen was transferred from Flesberg to the neighboring municipality of Kongsberg on 1 January 1964.

Geography 
The municipality is divided into the parishes Flesberg, Lyngdal, and Svene. Most of the population lives in the four villages of Svene, Lampeland, Flesberg, and Lyngdal.
In the western part of Flesberg, the landscape rises steeply to the mountain area of Blefjell, a popular tourist destination.

Demographics

Notable people 
 Finn Qvale (1873–1955) a military officer, cartographer and sports official
 Jul Låg (1915-2000) a scientist and soil researcher
 Hallvard Bakke (born 1943) a Norwegian politician

Sister cities 
The following cities are twinned with Flesberg:
  - Falkenberg, Halland County, Sweden
  - Fosston, Minnesota, United States
  - Lejre, Region Sjælland, Denmark
  - Savitaipale, Etelä-Suomi, Finland

References

External links 

 Municipal fact sheet from Statistics Norway
 

 
Municipalities of Buskerud
Municipalities of Viken (county)